Germia was a city in the late Roman province of Galatia Secunda in Central Anatolia.

History 

From the time of Justinian I (527–565), who went there to take the baths, Germia became known as Myriangeloi (Myriads of Angels) because of its celebrated shrine of Michael the Archangel and the Holy Angels.

The ruins of the Byzantine shrine are located in the village of Gümüşkonak, formerly known as Yörme, 8 km south of Günyüzü in Eskişehir Province, Turkey, as are the remains of the baths and of an inn that Justinian built.

Episcopal see 
In the 6th century, the geographer Hierocles mentioned Germia as a bishopric. By about 650 it was an autonomous archdiocese, a status it maintained in the 9th century and also under the emperors Leo the Wise (886–912), Constantine Porphyrogenitus (913–959), and Alexius I Comnenus (1081–1118). It had become an autocephalous metropolitan see in the time of Michael VIII Palaeologus (1259–1282), Andronicus II (1282–1328) and Andronicus III (1328–1341), but disappeared soon after.

It is now in the Catholic Church's list of titular sees.

References

 

Populated places of the Byzantine Empire
Dioceses in Asia
History of Eskişehir Province
Buildings of Justinian I
Dioceses of the Ecumenical Patriarchate of Constantinople